The Aphthartodocetae (Greek , from ἄφθαρτος, aphthartos, "incorruptible" and δοκεῖν, dokein, "to seem"), also called Julianists or Phantasiasts by their opponents, were members of a 6th-century Non-Chalcedonian sect. Their leader, Julian of Halicarnassus, taught that Christ's body was always incorruptible and only appeared to corrupt and exhibit blameless passions. This was in disagreement with another Non-Chalcedonian leader, Severus of Antioch, who insisted that Christ's body was passible, truly manifested blameless passions, was corruptible, and only became incorruptible following the resurrection. 

In the words of Severus, in his letter approving of the synodical letter of Theodosios I of Alexandria, the Julianists taught "the flesh of our Saviour, from its very establishment through the womb and the union, was impassible and immortal, and who assign to it the incorruptibility which is recognized in impassibility and immortality (and not simply in holiness and sinlessness)." Due to Christ being impassible, the doctrine of Julian made "the sufferings...false" and illusory: "For an impassible and immortal body does not admit of sufferings and death, but is considered to have suffered and died only in surmise, and as it were in an illusion of sleep." Severus asserts that such a doctrine where Christ only appears to have suffered places mankind "unavoidably...under the servitude of death...redeemed by nocturnal hallucinations and not in reality by the blood of his cross."

This is in contrast to what Severus approves in Theodosios' letter, which taught: "Your Holiness had affirmed well and fittingly that the body of our Lord and Saviour was consubstantial with us and suffered natural and voluntary sufferings like us, but without sin. And by this means you have put away those who have dared to assert that he suffered in an impassible and immortal body." Christ's sufferings are voluntary because "in that flesh united to the Word...there was nothing of the ancient sin which made our race wither: for when he became incarnate in a flesh which was of this sort, it was proper that he should draw near to death [i.e. voluntarily]."

Elsewhere, Severus summed up Julian's theology as follows:

In synopsis, Christ's body was passible and thereby had the capacity to actually corrupt according to Severus and Theodosios. In contrast, Julian allegedly taught Christ's body to be impassible, which would (according to Severus) make corruption impossible and thereby necessitate any corruption and suffering to be illusory. While Julian asserts Christ's corruptibility to be voluntary as a response to "impassibility" making it otherwise impossible, Severus and Theodosios assert that Christ's corruptibility is voluntary as a response to "sinlessness," which otherwise would not permit corruption as it is a punishment for sin. 

In 564, Emperor Justinian I adopted the tenets of the Aphthartodocetae, issued an "edict compelling assent to the notion that the body of Christ was 'incorruptible and not susceptible to the natural and blameless passions,'” (i.e. suffering) and attempted to elevate their beliefs to the rank of Orthodox dogma. Patriarch Eutychius of Constantinople, who had presided over the Fifth General Council, resisted Justinian's efforts by arguing the incompatibility of the Aphthartodocetic beliefs with scripture. Justinian ensured that John Scholasticus replaced Eutychius who was exiled from his see by Justinian. The Patriarch of Antioch, Anastasius, was also threatened with replacement and exile. Justinian prepared an edict to enforce the tenets among the communions throughout the empire, but its issue was prevented when Justinian died on 14 November 565, during the thirty-ninth year of his reign.

See also

References

Sources
 
 
 

Oriental Orthodox theology
Christianity in the Byzantine Empire
Christian denominations established in the 6th century
Christian terminology
Justinian I
Nature of Jesus Christ